A shuttlecraft is a fictional or theoretical spacecraft, usually capable of atmospheric transport.

Shuttlecraft may also refer to similar vehicles, such as:
 Shuttlecraft (Star Trek), in the Star Trek universe
 Imperial Shuttlecraft, in the Star Wars universe